Ahmed Saif Zaal Abu Muhair is a paralympic athlete from United Arab Emirates competing mainly in category T36 track events.

Ahmed competed in Sydney, Australia at the 2000 Summer Paralympics where he competed in the 800m and won a silver in the 400m and a bronze in the 200m.

References

Paralympic athletes of the United Arab Emirates
Athletes (track and field) at the 2000 Summer Paralympics
Paralympic silver medalists for the United Arab Emirates
Paralympic bronze medalists for the United Arab Emirates
Living people
Medalists at the 2000 Summer Paralympics
Year of birth missing (living people)
Paralympic medalists in athletics (track and field)
Emirati male sprinters